The 1923 Hawaii Deans football team was an American football team that represented the University of Hawaii as an independent during the 1923 college football season. In its third season under head coach Otto Klum, the team compiled a 5–1–2 record and outscored opponents by a total of 172 to 50. The season concluded with a 7 to 0 victory over the 1923 Oregon Agricultural Aggies football team in the Hawaii Holiday Classic on January 1, 1924.

Schedule

References

Hawaii
Hawaii Rainbow Warriors football seasons
Hawaii Deans football